Zoran Vujović (born 26 August 1958) is a Croatian retired footballer who played as a defender.

His twin brother, Zlatko, is also a former professional footballer. They were both Yugoslav internationals, and both spent a large part of their professional careers in France.

Playing career

Club
Vujović was born in Sarajevo. After starting his professional career at Hajduk Split, alongside his brother Zlatko, he (whom amassed nearly 400 overall appearances, scoring a career-best ten league goals in 32 games in the 1980–81 season as his team ranked in second position) moved aged 28 to France, where he would remain the next seven years safe for a short spell at Red Star Belgrade. His first stop – having been bought at the same time as his sibling – was FC Girondins de Bordeaux, as both were instrumental figures in the club's double in their first season.

Vujović retired in 1993 with OGC Nice, having his first coaching experience in 2007 in Morocco with KAC Kénitra.

International
Internationally he received 34 caps for Yugoslavia, and was a non-playing squad member at the 1982 FIFA World Cup; his debut came in a friendly with Italy, on 13 June 1979. His final international was a September 1989 friendly match against Greece.

References

External links
 

1958 births
Living people
Footballers from Sarajevo
Croats of Bosnia and Herzegovina
Twin sportspeople
Croatian twins
Bosnia and Herzegovina twins
Association football defenders
Association football utility players
Yugoslav footballers
Yugoslavia international footballers
Competitors at the 1979 Mediterranean Games
Mediterranean Games gold medalists for Yugoslavia
Mediterranean Games medalists in football
Olympic footballers of Yugoslavia
Footballers at the 1980 Summer Olympics
1982 FIFA World Cup players
Bosnia and Herzegovina footballers
Croatian footballers
HNK Hajduk Split players
Red Star Belgrade footballers
FC Girondins de Bordeaux players
AS Cannes players
OGC Nice players
Yugoslav First League players
Ligue 1 players
Ligue 2 players
Yugoslav expatriate footballers
Expatriate footballers in France
Yugoslav expatriate sportspeople in France
Bosnia and Herzegovina football managers
KAC Kénitra managers
Bosnia and Herzegovina expatriate football managers
Expatriate football managers in Morocco
Bosnia and Herzegovina expatriate sportspeople in Morocco